Loxosceles apachea, the Apache recluse, is a species of recluse spider in the family Sicariidae that occurs in the United States and Mexico.

References

Sicariidae
Articles created by Qbugbot
Spiders described in 1983